John Graydon Kidd (July 20, 1908, Edgewood, Texas – January 28, 1991, Nacogdoches, Texas) was an American physician, pathologist, and virologist.

Biography
Kidd graduated in 1928 with an A.B. from Duke University and in 1932 with an M.D. from Johns Hopkins University School of Medicine. From 1932 to 1934 he was a medical intern and assistant resident physician at Detroit's Henry Ford Hospital. In 1934 he became an assistant in pathology and bacteriology at Manhattan's Rockefeller Institute for Medical Research. There he was promoted to associate in 1938 and to associate member in 1942. In 1944 he resigned from the Rockefeller Institute and became the pathologist-in-chief and chair of the pathology department at the New York Hospital-Cornell Medical Center (now called the Weill Cornell Medical Center). He retired from the hospital in 1964 but continued his research and teaching at Cornell University before retiring as professor emeritus of pathology in 1975. In his last years he lived with his wife in Center, Texas.

He did research on oncoviruses and the serology of tumors and experimental pathology of cancer. He discovered that a constituent in the blood of guinea pigs could cure laboratory mice in some cases of experimentally-induced tumors. His discovery led to the identification and use of the enzyme asparaginase in chemotherapy against some forms of cancer, specifically, acute lymphoblastic leukemia (ALL) and lymphoblastic lymphoma (LBL). He frequently collaborated with Peyton Rous.

Kidd received in 1939 the Eli Lilly and Company-Elanco Research Award. He was elected in 1946 a fellow of the American Association for the Advancement of Science.

In 1930 he married Maudine Adams (1910–1997). Upon his death, he was survived by his widow, two sons, two daughters, five grandchildren, and one great-grandchild.

Selected publications

References

1908 births
1991 deaths
20th-century American physicians
American pathologists
American virologists
Cancer researchers
Duke University alumni
Johns Hopkins School of Medicine alumni
Cornell University faculty
NewYork–Presbyterian Hospital physicians
Fellows of the American Association for the Advancement of Science